XX Pyxidis is a star located in the constellation Pyxis.  It has an apparent magnitude that varies slightly at about 11.5, and is about 2,300 light years away.

XX Pyxidis is one of the more-studied members of a class of stars known as Delta Scuti variables—short-period (six hours at most) pulsating stars that have been used as standard candles and as subjects to study astroseismology. Astronomers made more sense of its pulsations when it became clear that it is also a binary star system. The main star is a white main sequence star of spectral type A4V that is around 1.85 times as massive as the Sun. Its companion is most likely a red dwarf star of spectral type M3V, around 0.3 times as massive as the Sun. The two are very close—possibly only 3 times the diameter of the Sun between them—and orbit each other every 1.15 days. The brighter star is deformed into an egg-shape, and pulsates in several overlapping modes 26-76 times per day.

References

Pyxis (constellation)
Pyxidis, XX
Delta Scuti variables
CD-24 7599
J08583903-2435106
A-type main-sequence stars
M-type main-sequence stars
Binary stars